Col du Fréjus (el. 2,542 metres) is a mountain col road in the Cottian Alps on the border between France and Italy. It connects Bardonecchia, Italy to Modane, France.

The road over the mountain pass is not paved and limited to walking  traffic. Vehicular traffic utilizes the Fréjus Road Tunnel.

See also
 List of highest paved roads in Europe
 List of mountain passes

Frejus
Frejus
Frejus
Metropolitan City of Turin
Frejus
Landforms of Savoie
Transport in Auvergne-Rhône-Alpes